Coyote Mountain may refer to the following mountains in the United States:

 Coyote Mountain (Nevada), Humboldt County, Nevada
 Coyote Mountain (New Mexico), Sierra County, New Mexico
 Coyote Mountain (Jefferson County, Oregon), Jefferson County, Oregon
 Coyote Mountain (Lane County, Oregon), Lane County, Oregon
 Coyote Mountain (Wheeler County, Oregon), Wheeler County, Oregon
 Coyote Mountain (Ferry County, Washington), Ferry County, Washington
 Coyote Mountain (Lewis County, Washington), Lewis County, Washington